The 1925 Loyola Lions football team was an American football team that represented Loyola College of Los Angeles (now known as Loyola Marymount University) as an independent during the 1925 college football season. In its third season under head coach William L. Driver, the team compiled a 4–2 record and outscored opponents by a total of 70 to 69.

Schedule

References

Loyola
Loyola Lions football seasons
Loyola Lions football